Étude Op. 25, No. 1 in A-flat major  is a solo piano work composed by Frédéric Chopin in 1836, and published in 1837. The work consists entirely of rapid arpeggios and harmonic modulations based on A-flat major.

Robert Schumann praised this work in a dissertation on the Études; calling it "a poem rather than a study", he coined for it the alternate name "Aeolian Harp". It is also sometimes known as "The Shepherd Boy," following an unsupported tale by Kleczyński that Chopin advised a pupil to picture a shepherd boy taking refuge in a grotto to avoid a storm playing the melody on his flute.

Structure 

This étude comprises a right-hand melody and supportive bass line, the accompaniment consisting of broken chords, provided by the inner voices of both hands, usually in semiquaver-tuplets. The left hand introduces polyrhythms from time to time. The principal melody is presented by the right hand on the first note of each group of sextuplets, with occasional counter-melodies provided by the inner voices.

The distinctive theme is presented in A-flat major. Through metamorphic modulations to closely related keys, it eventually arrives at a brief episode in the remote key of A major, but culminates with an intense climax in the home key, and a momentary reference to the original thematic material, which flows easily into the coda.

Technique

Technically, the piece requires dexterity to play the six-tuples fast enough, and to be able to move the hand across intervals as large as a 13th in the middle. The inner voice figures consist of repeated figures of arpeggiated chords. Schumann commented on Chopin's subtle emphasis on certain melodies throughout this piece. One difficulty the étude presents is the voicing of the inner counter-melodies. The three annotated studies by Leopold Godowsky  on this etude exploit this aspect of this piece and also introduce the student to further possibilities in the Chopin original.

Notes

References
Ashton Johnson, (reprinted 2010), A Handbook to Chopin's Works. (in Google Books).

External links
 Analysis of Chopin Etudes at Chopin: the poet of the piano
 
Sheet music available in .pdf or LilyPond format, from Mutopia.
 Op. 25, No. 1 played by Alfred Cortot
 Op. 25, No. 1 played by Arthur Rubinstein
 Op. 25, No. 1 played by Claudio Arrau
 Op. 25, No. 1 played by Dino Ciani
 Op. 25, No. 1 played by Géza Anda
 Op. 25, No. 1 played by Jorge Bolet
 Op. 25, No. 1 played by Ivan Moravec 
 Op. 25, No. 1 played by Vladimir Ashkenazy
 Op. 25, No. 1 played by Maurizio Pollini
 Op. 25, No. 1 played by Youri Egorov
Performances (video)
 

25 01
1836 compositions
Compositions in A-flat major